Pernille Mathiesen (born 5 October 1997) is a Danish professional racing cyclist, who currently rides for UCI Women's Continental Team .

Major results

2016
 1st Stage 4 Gracia–Orlová
2017
 UEC European Under-23 Road Championships
1st  Road race
1st  Time trial
1st  Combativity classification, Stage 4 Holland Ladies Tour
 National Road Championships
2nd Time trial
4th Road race

See also
 List of 2016 UCI Women's Teams and riders

References

External links
 

1997 births
Living people
Danish female cyclists
People from Holstebro
Sportspeople from the Central Denmark Region
21st-century Danish women